The women's hammer throw event at the 2008 African Championships in Athletics was held at the Addis Ababa Stadium on April 30.

Results

References
Results (Archived)
Results

2008 African Championships in Athletics
Hammer throw at the African Championships in Athletics
2008 in women's athletics